The George Ernest Morrison Lecture in Ethnology is given annually at the Australian National University in honour of George Ernest Morrison. The Lectures, founded by the Chinese community in Australia "to honour for all time the great Australian who rendered valuable service to China" were also, in the words of Geremie Barmé "related to Chinese-Australian resistance to White Australia policy, reflecting also the alarm and outrage resulting from the Japanese invasion of Manchuria in 1931." Several of the older lectures were reprinted in 1996 by East Asian History.

List of lectures
Lecturers have included:
1932 W.P. Chen 
1933 William Ah Ket
1934 James Stuart MacDonald
1935 W.P. Chen
1936 Wu Lien-teh
1937 Chun-jien Pao
1938 Aldred F. Barker
1939 Stephen Henry Roberts
1940 Howard Mowll
1941 W. G. Goddard
No lectures 1942-1947
1948 Douglas Copland
1949 J.K. Rideout
1951 C. P. Fitzgerald
1952 H.V. Evatt
1953 Michael Lindsay, 2nd Baron Lindsay of Birker
1954 Mischa Titiev
1955 Hans Bielenstein
1956 Leonard Bell Cox
1957 Otto van der Sprenkel
1958 A. R. Davis
1959 Charles Nelson Spinks
1960 Chen Chih-Mai
1961 L. Carrington Goodrich
1962 Göran Malmqvist
1963 Harry Simon (Sinologist)
1964 Wang Ling (historian)
1965 Abraham M. Halpern
1966 J.W. de Jong
1968 John Frodsham
1969 Arthur Huck
1970 Karl August Wittfogel
1971 Igor de Rachewiltz
1972 Eugene Kamenka
1973 Liu Ts'un-yan
1974 Jerome Ch'en
1975 Yi-fu Tuan
1976 Lo Hui-min
1977 Roy Hofheinz
1978 Mark Elvin
1979 Wang Gungwu
1980 Fang Chao-ying
1981 Tien Ju-K'ang
1982 Alan Thorne
1983 Chan Hok-lam
1984 John S. Gregory
1985 Allen S. Whiting
1986 Pierre Ryckmans (writer)
1987 Jean Chesneaux
1988 Ross Garnaut
1989 Stephen FitzGerald (diplomat)
1990 Rafe de Crespigny
1992 14th Dalai Lama
1993 William John Francis Jenner
1994 Ramon Myers
1995 Martin King Whyte
1996 Geremie Barmé
1997 Philip Kuhn
1998 Donald Leslie (academic)
1999 T.H. Barrett
2000 Frederick Teiwes
2001 Ezra Vogel
2002 Anita Chan
2003 Wen-hsin Yeh
2004 David S. G. Goodman
2005 John Minford
2006 Scott Rozelle
2007 Dai Qing
2008 Jane Macartney (journalist)
2009 none; two in 2010. 
2010 Kevin Rudd
2010 Børge Bakken
2011 Linda Jaivin
2012 Mark Elliott (historian)
2013 Michael Nylan
2014 Christine Wong
2015 David Walker (historian)
2016 Jonathan Unger
2017 Daniel Kane (linguist)
2018 Hamashita Takeshi
2019 John Makeham
2020 Benjamin Elman
2021 none; 2 in 2022
2022 Evelyn Goh
2022 Rana Mitter

References

Australian National University
Lecture series
Ethnology